Tonghua Province was one of the provinces of Manchukuo. It was created in 1941, when Andong Province was split into:
 Andong Province
 Tonghua Province

See also
 List of administrative divisions of Manchukuo

Provinces of Manchukuo